The white-bellied whipbird (Psophodes leucogaster), also called the Mallee whipbird, is a species of bird in the family Psophodidae. It is endemic to southern Australia.

Taxonomy 
The species was formerly considered as a subspecies of Psophodes nigrogularis, so shared the common name of "western whipbird". The Clements Checklist refers to this species with the common name western whipbird (white-bellied) to distinguish it from P. nigrogularis (black-throated).

The white-bellied whipbird was described by the Australian ornithologists Frank Howe and John Ross in 1933. It was split from the black-throated whipbird (formerly the western whipbird) based on a comparison of mitochondrial DNA sequences published in 2017.

Two subspecies are recognised:
 P. l. leucogaster Howe & Ross, JA, 1933 – south central Australia
 P. l. lashmari Mason, IJ & Schodde, 1991 – Kangaroo Island

References

white-bellied whipbird
Endemic birds of Australia
Birds described in 1933